Karl Viktor Hintz (10 April 1888, Tjöck - 7 June 1972; surname until 1921 Eriksson) was a Finnish farmer and politician. He was a member of the Parliament of Finland from 1929 to 1930, representing the Swedish People's Party of Finland (SFP).

References

1888 births
1972 deaths
People from Kristinestad
People from Vaasa Province (Grand Duchy of Finland)
Swedish People's Party of Finland politicians
Members of the Parliament of Finland (1929–30)